Anna Lynch-Robinson is a set decorator and art director who was nominated at the 85th Academy Awards for her work on the sets on the film Les Misérables. This was in the category of Best Production Design. She shared her nomination with Eve Stewart. She is the sister of Kit Lynch-Robinson, best known as the director on The Grand Tour and Top Gear

Selected filmography

Wonder Woman (2017)
Alice Through the Looking Glass (2016)
Muppets Most Wanted (2014)
Les Misérables (2012)
An Education (2009)
In Bruges (2008)
Bridget Jones: The Edge of Reason (2004)

References

External links

Living people
Year of birth missing (living people)
Best Production Design BAFTA Award winners
Art directors
Set decorators